Hu, also Angku or Kon Keu, is a Palaungic language of Xishuangbanna Dai Autonomous Prefecture, Yunnan, China. Its speakers are an unclassified ethnic minority; the Chinese government counts the Angku as members of the Bulang nationality, but the Angku language is not intelligible with Bulang.

Distribution
According to Li (2006:340), there are fewer than 1,000 speakers living on the slopes of the "Kongge" Mountain ("控格山") in Na Huipa village (纳回帕村), Mengyang township (勐养镇), Jinghong (景洪市, a county-level city).

They are also known locally as the Kunge people (昆格人) or Kongge people (控格人).

References

Further reading

External links 
 RWAAI (Repository and Workspace for Austroasiatic Intangible Heritage)
 Hu in RWAAI Digital Archive
 Hu recordings in Kaipuleohone include a word list, sentence elicitation and interview.

Languages of China
Palaungic languages